Rotten Apples (The Smashing Pumpkins – Greatest Hits as titled on the album's cover) is a greatest hits compilation album by alternative rock band The Smashing Pumpkins. In the US, it was released on November 20, 2001, along with a bonus disc titled Judas O. The album's concluding track, "Untitled", was the Pumpkins' final recording before their breakup. Completed in the days leading up to the band's farewell concert at the Metro in Chicago, it was also released as a single. Another notable track is "Real Love"; while previously released on Machina II/The Friends & Enemies of Modern Music, this was taken from the factory master tapes and, as a result, lacks the pops and clicks inherent in all copies of Machina II (which is vinyl sourced).

The title of the album is the namesake of a B-side that was released on the "Tonight, Tonight" single. Peaking at number 31 in the US, the album sold 77,000 units in its first week of being released.

Release and reception
Rotten Apples was released on November 20, 2001. According to Dan Tallis, writing for BBC, this album was "[a] rare pleasure these days, a collection of tracks that span a band's career that can actually justify the Greatest Hits title." Regarding the Judas O disc, Tallis wrote, "[t]he Judas O B-sides and rarities collection will satisfy Pumpkin obsessives with its outtakes from the Adore and Machina sessions, but it simply cannot compete with its sister CD. 'Here's to the Atom Bomb', 'Waiting' and 'Rock On', (yes, a cover of the David Essex classic - which also features lyrics from Van Halen songs) stand out from the others, which at worst slip into incoherent rock ramblings."

Track listing
There exists two versions of Rotten Apples; one is exclusive to North America and includes the song "Landslide", which is replaced by "Try, Try, Try" in the international version.

 "Rhinoceros" is misprinted as "Rhinocerous" on the back cover and the disc. Also, the version on the compilation is the version off the Lull EP where the last 30 seconds of the original recording (some guitar noise) is cut off.
The last half of "Drown" is also cut, getting rid of the extended guitar solo.

Personnel

The Smashing Pumpkins
Jimmy Chamberlin – drums (except "Eye", "Ava Adore" and "Perfect")
Billy Corgan – Songwriting, vocals, guitar, programming, mixing, production, art direction, bass on "Untitled"
James Iha – guitar
D'arcy Wretzky – bass guitar (except "Untitled")

Additional musicians
Matt Walker – drums on "Ava Adore"
Joey Waronker – drums on "Perfect"

Technical staff
Ted de Bono – production on "Landslide"
Bon Harris – additional programming on "Ava Adore" and "Perfect"
Butch Vig – production on "Siva", "Rhinoceros", "Drown", "Cherub Rock", "Today", and "Disarm"
Flood – production and mixing on "Bullet with Butterfly Wings", "1979", "Zero", "Tonight, Tonight", "Perfect", "The Everlasting Gaze", "Stand Inside Your Love", "Real Love", "Untitled", and "Try, Try, Try"; additional production and mixing on "Ava Adore" and "Perfect"
Roger Lian – digital editing
Alan Moulder – production and mixing on "Bullet with Butterfly Wings", "1979", "Zero", and "Tonight, Tonight"; mixing on "The Everlasting Gaze", "Stand Inside Your Love" and "Real Love"
Jennifer Quinn-Richardson – production coordination
Howie Weinberg – mastering
Brad Wood – additional production on "Ava Adore"

Art
Danny Clinch – photography
Lynne Fischer – photography
Lisa Johnson – photography, cover photo
David LaChapelle – photography
Michael Lavine – photography
Melodie McDaniel – photography
Greg Sylvester – art direction
Yelena Yemchuk – photography

Charts and certifications

Weekly charts

Year-end charts

Certifications

Judas O

Judas O (also known as Judas Ø) is a collection of B-sides and rarities by The Smashing Pumpkins. Initially released as free downloadable tracks by the band, it was ultimately packaged as a bonus disc in a limited-edition printing of the greatest hits collection Rotten Apples. The songs are from the Mellon Collie and the Infinite Sadness, Adore, and Machina/The Machines of God recording sessions, and some tracks can be found on The Aeroplane Flies High, and Machina II/The Friends & Enemies of Modern Music. Judas Ø is considered  to be the sister album to Pisces Iscariot, a collection of B-sides and rarities from the Gish and Siamese Dream era.

Track listing
All tracks written by Billy Corgan, except for "Believe" written by James Iha and "Rock On" written by David Essex.

Personnel

The Smashing Pumpkins
Billy Corgan – songwriter, vocals, lead and rhythm guitar, piano, producer, art direction
D'arcy Wretzky – bass guitar
Jimmy Chamberlin – drums
James Iha – lead and rhythm guitar, vocals, songwriter and producer on "Believe"
Melissa Auf der Maur – bass guitar on "Rock On"

Additional musicians
Matt Cameron – drums on "Because You Are"
Bon Harris – additional squeaks and plonks on "Saturnine"
Rick Nielsen – additional guitar on "Blissed and Gone"
Matt Walker – drums on "My Mistake"

Production
Kerry "Mango" Brown – production on "Believe"
Danny Clinch – photography
Eric Ferris — executive producer
Lynne Fischer – photography
Flood – production on "Lucky 13", "Here's to the Atom Bomb", and "Set the Ray to Jerry"
Lisa Johnson – photography, cover photo
David LaChapelle – photography
Michael Lavine – photography
Roger Lian — digital editing
Melodie McDaniel – photography
Jennifer Quinn – production manager
Greg Sylvester – art direction
Howie Weinberg – mastering
Yelena Yemchuk – photography

References

2001 greatest hits albums
Albums produced by Alan Moulder
Albums produced by Billy Corgan
Albums produced by Bjorn Thorsrud
Albums produced by Brad Wood
Albums produced by Butch Vig
Albums produced by Flood (producer)
Albums produced by James Iha
The Smashing Pumpkins compilation albums
Virgin Records compilation albums